Abdelhakim Sameur (born 12 November 1990 in Khenchela) is an Algerian football player. He currently plays for USM Khenchela in the Algerian Ligue Professionnelle 1.

References

External links
 

1990 births
Algerian footballers
Living people
People from Khenchela
WA Tlemcen players
CS Constantine players
CR Belouizdad players
Olympique de Médéa players
US Biskra players
Algerian Ligue Professionnelle 1 players
Association football midfielders
21st-century Algerian people
USM Khenchela players